Edwin Lord Weeks (18491903) was an American artist, noted for his Orientalist works.

Life

Weeks was born in Boston, Massachusetts in 1849. His parents were affluent spice and tea merchants from Newton, a suburb of Boston, and as such they were able to finance their son's youthful interest in painting and travelling. As a young man Weeks visited the Florida Keys to draw, and also travelled to Surinam in South America. His earliest known paintings date from 1867 when he was eighteen years old, although it is not until his Landscape with Blue Heron, dated 1871 and painted in the Everglades, that Weeks started to exhibit a dexterity of technique and eye for composition—presumably having taken professional tuition.

In 1872 Weeks relocated to Paris, becoming a pupil of Léon Bonnat and Jean-Léon Gérôme.

After his studies in Paris, Weeks emerged as one of America's major painters of Orientalist subjects. Throughout his adult life he was an inveterate traveler and journeyed to South America (1869), Egypt and Persia (1870), Morocco (frequently between 1872 and 1878), and India (1882–83).

In 1895 Weeks wrote and illustrated a book of travels, From the Black Sea through Persia and India, and in 1897 he published Episodes of Mountaineering (which was preceded by the 1894 article Some Episodes of Mountaineering, by a Casual Amateur).

Weeks died in Paris in November 1903. He was a member of the Légion d'honneur, France, an officer of the Order of Saint Michael (Bavaria), and a member of the Munich Secession.

Achievements
Weeks exhibited his work in nearly every annual Salon (Paris). He earned a Medal of Honor in 1884, then a Third Class Medal in 1889, followed by a gold medal at the 1889 International Exhibition, and finally the Legion of Honor in 1896.

Gallery

See also
 List of Orientalist artists
 Orientalism

References

Sources
 Edwin Lord Weeks, "Hindoo and Moslem", Harper's New Monthly Magazine, Vol. 91, No. 545, October 1895, pp. 651–669.

External links

Comprehensive site with biography, images by the artist, and more.
Weeks Gallery at MuseumSyndicate
Weeks at the Art Renewal Center
Few paintings at a persian website shahrefarang.com

1849 births
1903 deaths
American illustrators
19th-century American painters
19th-century American male artists
American male painters
20th-century American painters
Artists from Boston
Chevaliers of the Légion d'honneur
American orientalists
Orientalist painters
20th-century American male artists